Middlesex Turnpike may refer to:
Middlesex Turnpike (Connecticut)
Middlesex Turnpike (Massachusetts)